Glenwood is a city in Wheeler County, Georgia, United States. The population was 747 at the 2010 census.

Geography

Glenwood is located at  (32.181165, -82.672806).

Demographics

As of the census of 2000, there were 884 people, 354 households, and 210 families residing in the city. The racial makeup of the city was 57.81% White, 38.24% African American, 0.23% Native American, 0.45% Asian, 2.04% from other races, and 1.24% from two or more races. Hispanic or Latino of any race were 2.60% of the population.

There were 354 households, out of which 31.1% had children under the age of 18 living with them, 36.4% were married couples living together, 20.1% had a female householder with no husband present, and 40.4% were non-families. 37.0% of all households were made up of individuals, and 18.1% had someone living alone who was 65 years of age or older.  The average household size was 2.32 and the average family size was 3.10.

In the city, the population was spread out, with 25.0% under the age of 18, 10.1% from 18 to 24, 24.8% from 25 to 44, 21.4% from 45 to 64, and 18.8% who were 65 years of age or older.  The median age was 38 years. For every 100 females, there were 80.4 males.  For every 100 females age 18 and over, there were 75.4 males.

The median income for a household in the city was $16,900, and the median income for a family was $23,125. Males had a median income of $25,500 versus $20,000 for females. The per capita income for the city was $13,301.  About 26.8% of families and 36.4% of the population were below the poverty line, including 54.3% of those under age 18 and 37.2% of those age 65 or over.

Glenwood has a nursing home and two public parks.  The hospital, Lower Oconee Community Hospital, closed in 2014, citing costs related to the Affordable Care Act.  Hospital reopened, then in 2015 Lower Oconee Community Hospital closed down for second time. There are six major churches in the city:  Glenwood African Methodist Episcopal,  Glenwood United Methodist, Glenwood Baptist, Glenwood Grove Missionary Baptist, Glenwood Church of God, and Friendship Baptist.

References

Cities in Georgia (U.S. state)
Cities in Wheeler County, Georgia